Shintarō is any of several Japanese male given names. They consist of a prefix followed by "tarō", which alone is a name common among first sons. Prefixes carry additional meaning, such as "new"; many of these can stand alone as a given name.

Real people who have used the name include

(using the kanji 新太郎)
 actor Shintaro Katsu (stage name);
 former baseball player Shintarō Hirose (Yokohama Taiyō Whales and other teams);
 magician Shintarō Fujiyama
(using the kanji 慎太郎)
 Tokyo governor Shintaro Ishihara;
 Edo period Tosa han samurai Nakaoka Shintarō;
 Hokkaidō Nippon Ham Fighters baseball player Shintaro Ejiri;
 TBS announcer Shintarō Kaidō;
 Orix Buffaloes baseball player Shintaro Yoshida
(using the kanji 真太郎) Fukuoka SoftBank Hawks baseball player Yoshitake Shintarō
(using the kanji 晋太郎) politician Shintaro Abe
, Japanese politician
, Japanese sprinter
, Japanese footballer
 Shintarō Saitō, Japanese shogi player
, Japanese samurai
, Japanese footballer
, Japanese model, actor and singer
, Japanese businessman
, Japanese baseball player

In fiction, Akikusa Shintaro was the nom de guerre of the lead character from the cult 1960s Japanese TV series The Samurai.

In the anime, volume of light novels, manga, and Vocaloid series Kagerou Project, also known as Mekakucity Actors, the protagonist is named Shintarō Kisaragi. Also in Beelzebub one of the delinquents who hangs out with Hajime Kanzaki  is named Shintaro Natsume. In a series called Magics, one of the protagonists is called Shintaro Carter

References

Japanese masculine given names